George Cole (born October 10, 1960) is an American music producer, composer, lyricist, vocalist, session musician, and guitarist. He fronts his own Gypsy jazz/Uptown Swing band and since early 2014 has been the guitarist for the David Grisman Quintet. Before his acoustic music endeavors, he played electric guitar for the pop rock band Beatnik Beatch and Big Blue Hearts. He played on Chris Isaak's platinum Forever Blue album. Cole is also a teacher, and his students include Billie Joe Armstrong and Mike Dirnt of Green Day; Ethan Roberts, and Danny Jones.

Early life
Cole grew up in Richmond, California. He attended Kennedy High School. He performed in the band "Young Country" in the late 1970s and The Upstarts in the early 1980s. His favorite childhood band was the Benny Goodman Quartet. He also loved Louis Prima, Keely Smith, The Mills Brothers, Lawrence Welk, Alan Sherman, Dave Clark Five, The Turtles, The Zombies, Country Joe and the Fish, Jimi Hendrix, The Grateful Dead, and the Beatles.

Guitar instructor

Cole has taught guitar lessons to promising musicians for nearly 30 years. He began teaching guitar lessons in California in the 1980s. He taught Billie Joe Armstrong for ten years and the bassist Mike Dirnt of the punk rock band Green Day. "Cole and Billie Joe would frequently spend afternoons jamming together, free-form style with the teacher winging off as many odd notes as his pupil." He helped arrange their first recording session at RDR studios in San Francisco in 1986. Armstrong received his first electric guitar, a Fernandes Stratocaster copy that he named "Blue", that his mother bought from Cole. Cole bought the new guitar from David Margen of the band Santana. Cole gave Armstrong a Bill Lawrence Humbucking pickup and told him to install the pickup in the bridge position. Armstrong then switched back to a Seymour Duncan JB pickup that he still uses today. "Armstrong fetishized his teacher's guitar, partly because the blue instrument had a sound quality and Van Halen–worthy fluidity he couldn't get from his little red Hohner. He prized it mostly, however, because of his relationship with Cole, another father figure after the death of Andy."

Career

Cole was lead guitarist in the pop rock band Beatnik Beatch from 1984–1988. In Beatnik Beatch he performed with Warren Zevon and Buster Poindexter. Beatnik Beatch has a music video on VH1 which features Cole. The group won a BAMMY – Bay Area Music Award for Best New Major Label Artist.

Cole was a member of the band Big Blue Hearts from 1997–2000. He toured with Joe Walsh of The Eagles, recorded with producer Roy Thomas Baker, and they performed with Robert Cray, Ringo Starr, and Boz Scaggs.

Cole started the gypsy jazz band George Cole Quintet in 2006 and is the Producer, composer, lyricist, Vocalist, and lead guitarist. The band was a five-piece acoustic gypsy jazz group. Cole performed a sold out performance at Carnegie Hall in New York as part of a world flute festival concert to benefit In Defense of Animals. The band performed at a San Francisco Chapter of National Academy of Recording Arts and Sciences's (Grammys) celebration.

In 2010–2011 Cole released his most recent recording Riverside Drive and toured extensively in the United States with a quintet.

As of 2013, Cole performs Gypsy Jazz and Uptown Swing. In January 2014 Cole performed with David "Dawg" Grisman as part of the David Grisman Sextet. Cole was asked to join the David Grisman Sextet, assuming the guitar chair first held by Tony Rice and subsequently Mark O'Connor, Frank Vignola, and Mike Marshall.

Instruments
Cole has owned and performed with acoustic Selmer Guitars 103 and 520.  Selmer 520 was played by Django Reinhardt on a tour in Europe in the 1940s. Cole plays guitars made by master luthier Bob Holo as well as Eastman, Martin, and Gibson guitars.

Discography

As leader
 George Cole (2004)
 Riverside Drive (Oceanview, 2010)

As sideman
 Beatnik Beatch, At the Zula Pool (Industrial, 1986)
 Beatnik Beatch, Beatnik Beach (1988)
 David Grisman, The David Grisman Sextet (Acoustic Disc, 2016)

References

External links
 Official website

1960 births
American male singers
American rock singers
American jazz guitarists
American rock guitarists
American male guitarists
American multi-instrumentalists
Gypsy jazz guitarists
Musicians from Richmond, California
Living people
Singers from California
Guitarists from California
20th-century American guitarists
Jazz musicians from California
20th-century American male musicians
American male jazz musicians